James Joseph Wahler (born July 29, 1966) is a former American football defensive lineman in the National Football League (NFL) for the Phoenix Cardinals and the Washington Redskins.  He played college football for UCLA and was drafted in the fourth round of the 1989 NFL Draft.

References

External links
 

1966 births
Living people
Players of American football from San Jose, California
American football defensive tackles
UCLA Bruins football players
Phoenix Cardinals players
Washington Redskins players